Kimberley is a surname in the English language. A variant form of the surname is Kimberly.

Kimberley is derived from any of several places in England named Kimberley. However, several such places have differing etymologies. For example, the Kimberly in Norfolk is derived from two Old English elements: the first is the feminine personal name Cyneburg; the second element is lēah, meaning "wood" or "clearing". The Kimberly in Nottinghamshire is similarly derived, although the personal name is Cynemær. Likewise the Kimberly in Warwickshire is derived from the personal name Cynebold.

An early record of the surname is de Chineburlai, in 1161; and de Kynmerley, in 1300.

The Earls of Kimberley derived their title from the place name in Norfolk. Their name gave rise to the like-named place Kimberley, in Northern Cape, South Africa. From this South African place name comes the modern given names Kimberley and Kimberly.

Notable people with the surname include:
Anna Kimberley (born 1995), English female professional squash player
Barry Kimberley (born 1957), Australian rules footballer
Eleazer Kimberly (1639–1709), the sixth Secretary of the State of Connecticut
John A. Kimberly (1838–1928), American manufacturing executive, a founder of Kimberly-Clark Corporation
Jonathan Kimberley DD (1651–1720), Dean of Lichfield from 1713 until his death
Lawrence Kimberley (born 1962), Dean of Christchurch since 2015
Lewis Kimberly (1830–1902), United States Naval officer during the American Civil War
Maria Kimberly (born 1943 or 1944), former American top model and actress
Oliver Kimberley, Anglican priest in the first half of the Twentieth century
Patrícia Kimberly, born Gisele Barbosa (born 1984), Brazilian prostitute, stripper, pornographic actress
Percy Kimberley (1878–1949), Australian rules footballer
Ron Kimberley (1914–1981), Australian rules footballer
Talis Kimberley, British folk singer/songwriter, activist, and political figure
Walter Kimberley (1884–1917), English footballer

See also
Kimberley (disambiguation)

References

English toponymic surnames